Georgina Lara Booth FRSA is a British-Dutch humanitarian public figure, actress, writer and journalist. She is the first ever Chief Editor Social Good of the global digital news platform and media company Mashable (Benelux), where she is also an Entertainment, Tech and Science Editor and Writer. Booth was the first person from the Netherlands to receive the International Diana Princess of Wales Memorial Award in 2013.

Biography
In order to raise money for young victims of the 2004 Tsunami disaster, Booth organized a large music concert in the Netherlands that attracted thousands of visitors when she was just 10 years old. She co-organized the concert with her then 12-year-old sister Natasha. Playgrounds and sports fields were built in Indonesia in several villages with the funds raised by Booth through her benefit concert. Subsequently, Booth was officially appointed to the prominent position of Humanitarian Youth Ambassador for Haarlemmermeer, one of the largest municipalities in the Netherlands. She was also the first and youngest youth ambassador to have been appointed by the governmental officials of the municipality and she played an important role in the promotion of the Dutch municipality's youth policy. She also served as the source of inspiration for humanitarian work to all young people of the municipality.

At the age of 16, Booth co-founded her own foundation with her sister, 4U&U Foundation, of which she is the president and founding board member. Booth received special permission to establish her foundation from a district court judge due to her young age as a minor under Dutch Law. 4U&U is a youth foundation that has encouraged volunteer work and peace to youth for more than a decade, such as through social media and peace-related activities. 4U&U Foundation has also organized benefit events to raise money for various humanitarian and charity projects in collaborative foundation partnerships.

Besides serving her foundation as co-founder and president, Booth has also held the title of Ambassador of Peace of the National Ministry of Peace in the Netherlands in a collaborative partnership with IKV Pax Christi.  She was the youngest ever Ambassador of Peace when she established her Embassy of Peace on a regional scale in the Netherlands in 2012. Her Embassy of Peace was central to all world peace and security related activities during Peace Week and the National Day of Peace declared by the United Nations in the district of her embassy. Booth organized many activities as an Ambassador of Peace, ranging from a Masquerade Peace Ball in the Dutch National Museum of Ethnology to lectures and debates about peace with many prominent experts, including the former Defense Minister of the Netherlands Joris Voorhoeve, a Dutch Member of Parliament and Dutch musician Merlijn Twaalfhoven about conflicts surrounding raw materials in countries such as Congo, Colombia and Sudan.

In 2005, Booth won a nationwide competition to design the new national slogan for Unicef's Kids United in the Netherlands. Her slogan "Van Pool tot Pool, elk kind naar school!" (Dutch for: From Pole to Pole, all children should go to school) was published on posters, flags, magazines, flyers, and other merchandise and was also mentioned on the Kids United TV show.

As an advocate for women's rights, Booth has also been a UN Women delegate for the United Kingdom since 2021 and attended the Commission on the Status of Women, the United Nations organ promoting gender equality and the empowerment of women.

Career

Acting 
Besides humanitarian work, Booth is an actress for television, film and theatre. She has appeared in various professional productions ranging from starring in the European TV show Le Camping with Flemish Sesame Street actress Sien Diels to a Stephen King film, performing on the NCRV children's TV show Buya with Jetske van den Elsen, voiceover work for the ITV series Van der Valk and performing in theatre at the Dutch Children's Rights festival with fellow Dutch television actors like Victoria Koblenko. Booth trained in acting at several leading drama schools, such as the Royal Academy of Dramatic Art (RADA) in London, and studied method acting at The Lee Strasberg Theatre and Film Institute in New York City.

Journalism and writing 
Booth leads the Social Good content and publications desk of Mashable (Benelux), writing about social good, sustainability, social entrepreneurship, charities, NGOs and humanitarian work.

As Editor, Writer and Journalist for Entertainment, Tech and Science at Mashable (Benelux), Booth also writes about Entertainment, Tech, Film and Television, Books, Law and Politics, Sustainability, Nature and Environment, Science, Food and Hospitality, Travel, History, Visual Arts, Performing Arts, Films and Television, Robotics, Artificial Intelligence (A.I.), Space, Innovation, Gaming America and Entrepreneurship.

Booth has interviewed many public figures and Hollywood celebrities, including Martin Luther King III and family, Angelina Jolie, Pierce Brosnan, Robin Wright, 
Khloé Kardashian, Prince Constantijn of The Netherlands, Joseph Gordon-Levitt, Victoria's Secret supermodel Behati Prinsloo Levine, Harry Potter star Domhnall Gleeson and Brian Gleeson, Neil Burger, Jeremy Piven, Elizabeth Chambers, Tye Sheridan and more.

Awards
For her humanitarian work, Booth has been recognized nationally and internationally and has received awards for her work, including an Honorary Medal from the Netherlands Public Broadcasting Television Station, awarded by Dutch MP Femke Halsema, and the International Award for Young People (Gold Medal). At the age of 17, Booth was the youngest of the top 3 final lobbyists of 'Holland's Next Top Lobbyist' named by Amnesty International, Oxfam Novib and IKV Pax Christi.

At the age of 18, Booth was the first recipient of the International Diana Princess of Wales Memorial Award from the Netherlands, awarded by British Prime Minister David Cameron.

At the age of 20, Booth was elected to Fellowship of the Royal Society of Arts in London, UK, for achievement and contribution to the arts and society. As a Fellow, she has the honour of carrying the post-nominal title FRSA.

Booth was awarded the prestigious and selective Fulbright Scholarship by the Fulbright Commission, founded by U.S. senator J. William Fulbright, and the United States State Department for graduate studies at the Ivy League university Columbia University in the City of New York. Booth was also the only Fulbright Scholar awarded the prestigious NAF-Velmans Fellowship in International Communications for Journalism, Publishing, Public Relations, Social Media and Historical Research by The Netherland-America Foundation, a fellowship founded by Dutch authors, Hill & Knowlton CEO and public relations pioneer Loet Velmans and Edith Velmans. Booth was also the only Fulbright Scholar awarded the Ivy Circle scholarship for her master's degree at Columbia University.

External links
 
 
 Biography on Mashable

References 

Living people
English women activists
21st-century Dutch journalists
English journalists
British actresses
British writers
British women writers
Dutch writers
Dutch women writers
Columbia University alumni
British women editors
Dutch humanitarians
Women humanitarians
Dutch columnists
Dutch women columnists
British columnists
British women columnists
Dutch television actresses
Dutch film actresses
Year of birth missing (living people)